Aaron Dee Norris (born November 23, 1951) is an American stunt performer, director, occasional actor, and film and television producer. He is the younger brother of action film star Chuck Norris.

Career

1974 to 1988: Stunt work to directing
While his older brother Chuck Norris was on his rise to stardom, Aaron Norris began his career as an uncredited stunt man in movies such as Black Belt Jones (1974), Speedtrap (1977), and Breaker! Breaker! (1977) (his brother Chuck's starring debut). The following year he was hired again as martial arts choreographer (credited) and a stunt double (uncredited) for his brother's second film Good Guys Wear Black- where he acted, credited, as "Al" one of the "Black Tigers" in an early scene- (1978) directed by Ted Post. He is noted to have performed the flying sidekick through the windshield of a speeding car, the stunt that sold the movie. He also played a small role in this movie. Later on that same year, director Ted Post re-collaborated with Norris who is a credited stuntman for Post's film Go Tell the Spartans, and was a stunt coordinator for the John Carpenter film Elvis starring Kurt Russell.

In 1979, Norris played Anderson in A Force of One starring his brother Chuck, with whom he shared the fight choreography credit. Norris is also credited as the stunt coordinator and listed amongst the stuntmen. The director noted that Aaron wanted to learn everything, and was a real asset to the picture. Because of this the director had him to focus on the martial art, and the specific of the fighting. The same year he was also a stuntman for the Italian film The Visitor.

In 1980, Norris did the Karate fight choreography and played the role of Hatband for his brother's film The Octagon.

In 1981, with his brother playing the lead, Norris was stunt player in Steve Carver's An Eye for an Eye.

In 1982, Norris was an associate producer and a stunt person in his brother's film Silent Rage.

In 1983, Norris was again an associate producer on a film starring Chuck, Steve Carver's Lone Wolf McQuade, where he also did stunt coordination and played a small role.

During that decade, he worked as the stunt coordinator for I, the Jury with Armand Assante, White Water Rebels with James Brolin, Chained Heat with Linda Blair, the dance film Breakin', Lies with Ann Dusenberry, and The Naked Cage with Shari Shattuck.

In 1988 he directed Braddock: Missing in Action III. That same year he also directed the war drama Platoon Leader, starring Michael Dudikoff.

1990 to 2002: Subsequent projects
Norris continued directing with his brother as the lead in Delta Force 2 (1990), The Hitman, Sidekicks (1993)., Hellbound (1994), Top Dog  (1995), and Forest Warrior (1996).

In 1995, he produced the film Ripper Man.

In 1996, he played the leading man in the film Overkill. That year he started to work on his brother's long lasting TV show Walker, Texas Ranger (1993-2001), during his tenure he served as an executive producer for 168 television episodes. He wrote and directed four episodes.

In 1998, Norris was an executive producer, and participated to writing the story of for the CBS television film Logan's War: Bound by Honor. Sharing the lead with Chuck is actor Eddie Cibrian.  The television-film was ranked third among the thirteen most viewed shows of that week.

In 1999, he created and was an executive producer on the Walker, Texas Ranger spin-off Sons of Thunder.

In the early 2000, Norris was an executive producer for the CBS television films The President's Man (2000), and The President's Man: A Line in the Sand (2002).

2005 to present day: Current work
In 2005, Norris was an executive producer and acted in the film The Cutter. That same year he returned to directing with the CBS Movie of the Week, Walker, Texas Ranger: Trial by Fire. A continuation of the series Walker, Texas Ranger, with Chuck Norris reprising his role.

In 2007, he produced the documentary Inside Aphasia.

In 2009, Norris produced Bill Duke's Not Easily Broken starring Morris Chestnut and Taraji P. Henson. That same year he also produced the film Everyday Life with Brad Hawkins. That year, he worked on stunts on the Luc Besson film I Love You Phillip Morris. Also in 2009, he was named the "president of development and production" of ALN, formerly The American Life Network.

In 2010, he provided stunts for the film Skateland.

In 2015, he provided utility stunts for the Marvel Comics film Ant-Man starring Paul Rudd.

Personal
Norris is the younger brother of Chuck Norris (born March 10, 1940), and Wieland Clyde Norris (1943–1970). During the Vietnam War, both Aaron and his older brother Wieland enlisted in the United States Army.  Wieland was killed in action in Vietnam in 1970. Through Chuck, Norris is the uncle of Mike and Eric Norris.

On December 2, 2010, he (along with brother Chuck) were given the title honorary Texas Ranger by Texas Governor Rick Perry.

Martial Arts 
He currently holds a tenth degree black belt in the Chuck Norris System Chun Kuk Do, a martial art created by his brother Chuck Norris.

Director

Producer

Stunts

Actor

References

External links
 

1951 births
Living people
20th-century American male actors
21st-century American male actors
Action film directors
American male film actors
American male karateka
American people of English descent
American tang soo do practitioners
Film directors from California
Male actors from Los Angeles County, California
Military personnel from California
People from Gardena, California
United States Army soldiers